The Ward can refer to:
Ward (disambiguation)
The Ward (film),  horror film directed by John Carpenter
The Ward (2000 video game),  point and click adventure video game developed by Fragile Bits 
Children's Ward,  British children's television drama series
The Ward, Toronto, neighbourhood in central Toronto
Dementium: The Ward, game for the Nintendo DS